Haslam may refer to:

 Haslam (surname)
 Haslam, South Australia, a town and locality in Australia
 Haslam Creek, a place on Vancouver Island in Canada, part of the Trans Canada Trail
 Haslam Heights, a line of peaks in Graham Land, Antarctica
 Haslam Lake, a lake in British Columbia, Canada
 Haslam Park, a park in the Ashton-on-Ribble area of Preston, Lancashire, England
 Haslam Park Primary School, in Bolton, Lancashire
 Haslam Shoals, located off the coast of Malaysia near Kuantan

See also 

 Haslum, a district in the municipality of Bærum, Norway.